Darkness Visible is a 1979 novel by British author William Golding. The book won the James Tait Black Memorial Prize. The title comes from Paradise Lost, from the line, "No light, but rather darkness visible".

The novel narrates a struggle between good and evil, using naïveté, sexuality and spirituality throughout. It marked Golding's re-emergence as a novelist, eight years after the publication of his previous book, the collection The Scorpion God.

A dark and complex novel, it centres on Matty - introduced in chapter one as a naked child emerging horribly disfigured from a bomb explosion during the London Blitz in World War II. He becomes a ward of the state and is put into a boarding school, where he is shunned by both children and adults. When he grows up, however, his selfless kindness and mysterious persona attract a devoted following of people who believe him to be a saint.

The second part of the book is centered on twins Toni and Sophy from the point of view of Sophy. Their story starts from their childhood, when they are around 10 years old, and follows their growth as they become young adults.

The recurring theme in these two stories is madness, Matty being split between his two faces, and Sophy being schizoid as she is split between her and her sister and others.

References

1979 British novels
Novels by William Golding
Novels about ephebophilia
Novels about child sexual abuse
Faber and Faber books
Pedophilia in literature